Pain Darb and Payandard may refer to:
 Pain Darb-e Pain